Putinka is a brand of Russian vodka made by the state-owned Moscow Distillery Crystal company. Created in 2003 by Vinexem Brand Manager Stanislav Kaufman, the brand plays upon President Vladimir Putin's name. 

The brand is owned by businessman Arkady Rotenberg, a close confidant of Putin, though Putin has no formal involvement in the production of Putinka. Putinka was formerly one of the most popular vodka brands in the Russian market, though the brand's popularity began to decline in 2016.

History 
Vodka Putinka has received many different awards. In 2004, the advisory council of "Superbrand" chaired by Alexander Shokhin awarded it the title of vodka "Superbrand of 2004". In 2011, the company behind Putinka registered a trademark for a liquor named "Commendatore Muammer" in honor of Muammar Gaddafi.

By 2016, the brand began losing popularity, with the market share slipping from 4th to 15th among vodka brands in the Russian market in 2016. 

Amid the 2022 Russian invasion of Ukraine, the producer applied for registering the letters “Z" and “V”, both of which correspond to military symbols used in the war, in a request to Rospatent.

References

Russian vodkas
Russian brands